Kenichiro Teratsuji (寺辻健一郎; Teratsuji Kenichiro, born September 28, 1979 in Yokohama, Japan), better known by his stage names Kenchi Tachibana (橘ケンチ) or simply KENCHI, is a Japanese dancer and actor. He is a member of J-Pop groups Exile and Exile The Second. He was also member of J Soul Brothers' second generation Nidaime J Soul Brothers until their migration to Exile in 2009.

He is represented with LDH and also acts as a representative of LDH Asia.

Biography 
Kenchi was born on September 28, 1979, in Yokohama, Japan and grew up in Yokosuka, Kanagawa Prefecture.

He became an active dancer in his youth and joined dance teams such as Poly-3, Fulcrum and Red Blockerz in his early 20s. At the same time, he also started working as an LDH apparel staff.

In 2007, he was selected as a member of the group Nidaime J Soul Brothers. They announced their indefinite hiatus after releasing one album in 2009 and all members joined the line-up of Exile shortly after.

In July 2012, Kenchi joined the Exile sub-unit Exile The Second alongside his fellow former Nidaime J Soul Brothers members Nesmith, Shokichi, Keiji and Tetsuya.

On December 4, 2015, he was announced as leader of Exile The Second.

In 2017, Kenchi entered the literature business by becoming an ambassador for the 2nd Short Shorts Award. He also opened his blog Tachibana Bookstore, in which he regularly introduces the books he has read.

While attending a business presentation for the Future Sake Project (未来の日本酒プロジェクト) held in Tokyo on February 21, 2019, he expressed his desire to enter the Sake business with a long-term perspective. On September 8 in the same year, Kenchi opened his first Izakaya with the name LDH Kitchen IZAKAYA AOBADAI in Tokyo. The Izakaya is intended to collaborate with local Sake breweries and to hold events related to Sake and Japanese culture every day.

In 2023, he made his stage musical debut, in the role of Miguel da Corella in CESARE ~ Creator of Destruction ~.

Personal life 
Kenchi and Exile members Akira, Tetsuya and Keiji met each other and became friends in the early 2000s, long before entering LDH as artists.

On October 1, 2019, Kenchi announced his marriage to a non-celebrity woman in her 30s. They were introduced to each other by mutual friends and had been dating for 3 years. This made him the 8th married member of Exile.

Participating groups

Filmography

※His roles in bold are his starring works

Stage

Films

TV dramas

Internet dramas

TV programmes

Radio

Advertisements

Magazine serials

Others

References

External links
 at Exile Official Website 

1979 births
Living people
Japanese male film actors
Japanese male television actors
Japanese male dancers
Male actors from Kanagawa Prefecture
LDH (company) artists